Washington Rodríguez Medina (April 6, 1944 – 31 December 2014) was a Uruguayan boxer, who won a bronze medal in the bantamweight category (– 54 kg) at the 1964 Summer Olympics.

Earlier in 1962 Rodríguez won a bantamweight bronze medal at the Latin American Games. After the 1964 Olympics he turned professional, and retired in 1969 with a record of five wins (four by knockout) and one loss. He then worked at the National Bank of Uruguay.

References

1944 births
2014 deaths
Bantamweight boxers
Boxers at the 1964 Summer Olympics
Olympic boxers of Uruguay
Olympic bronze medalists for Uruguay
Uruguayan people of Spanish descent
Sportspeople from Montevideo
Olympic medalists in boxing
Uruguayan male boxers
Medalists at the 1964 Summer Olympics